Joseph Remi Prudhomme (April 24, 1942 – December 6, 1990) was an American football offensive lineman in the National Football League and the American Football League. He attended Louisiana State University, where he was an All-American defensive tackle in 1964 for the LSU Tigers.

Buffalo Bills 1960s
Even though he was injured in 1965 and thus did not dress for a regular season game for the Bills, he was given an American Football League Championship ring for the 1965 season.

Kansas City Chiefs and New Orleans Saints
Prudhomme played for the AFL's Kansas City Chiefs in 1968 and 1969, thus also earning a 1969 AFL Championship ring and a ring from the Chiefs victory over the NFL's Minnesota Vikings in the fourth and final AFL-NFL World Championship Game, better known as Super Bowl IV. In that game, he recovered a Vikings fumble at the Minnesota 19 to set up Mike Garrett's five-yard touchdown run. He later played for the NFL's New Orleans Saints in 1971 and 1972.

Buffalo Bills 1972
In 1972, Prudhomme became the starting center for the Bills, playing in 6 of 14 games, splitting time with John Matlock and replacing Bruce Jarvis.

See also
List of American Football League players

References

External links
Story of Prudhomme's 1965 AFL Championship ring

1942 births
1990 deaths
American football offensive linemen
Cajun sportspeople
LSU Tigers football players
Buffalo Bills players
Kansas City Chiefs players
New Orleans Saints players
All-American college football players
People from Opelousas, Louisiana
Players of American football from Louisiana
American Football League players